Theophanis Lamboukas (Greek: Θεοφάνης Λαμπουκάς, 26 January 1936 – 28 August 1970), professionally known as Théo Sarapo, was a French singer and actor, and the second husband of the French singer Édith Piaf. Formerly a hairdresser, he was 26 years old when he married the 46-year-old Piaf. He was introduced to her by Claude Figus, Piaf's secretary.

Biography
Sarapo was born in Paris to Greek parents. He scored a hit with Piaf in 1962 with the song "À quoi ça sert l'amour?" (What Good Is Love?) and solo hits with "La maison qui ne chante plus" (The House Which No Longer Sings), and "Ce jour viendra" (That Day Will Come); its English-language version, "Our Day Will Come", was covered by Ruby & the Romantics and others.

When he began singing with Piaf Sarapo's voice was rather nasal, but over the next few years his tone mellowed. His other hits included "La Ronde" (The Round) and "Nous n'étions pas pareils" (We Weren't Alike).

His best known film as an actor was Judex, directed by Georges Franju, which was being filmed at the time of Piaf's death.

After Piaf's death, French law transferred her seven million francs worth of debts to Sarapo, leading to his eviction on Christmas Day 1963 from the apartment they shared on Boulevard Lannes.

Sarapo, who was 34 at the time, died at the side of the road in Limoges, Haute-Vienne, the result of an automobile accident on 28 August 1970 in the commune of Panazol. He is buried with Piaf and her daughter Marcelle (by lover Louis Dupont) in Père Lachaise Cemetery in Paris. The motto on their tomb translates as "Love Conquers All". Édith's father, Louis Alphonse Gassion, is also buried in the tomb (his name is engraved on the right side of the tombstone along with Édith's and Théo's). Daughter Marcelle's name is engraved on the opposite side. Etched at the foot of the tomb are the words "Famille (Family) Gassion-Piaf."

Édith Piaf 
Sarapo was the last in a long line of Piaf discoveries (including Yves Montand, Les Compagnons de la chanson, Georges Moustaki, Charles Aznavour, etc.). Sarapo often recorded and performed in concert with Piaf during their marriage.

Stage name 
His stage name "Sarapo", as pronounced in French, is Greek for "I love you" (Σ'αγαπώ, s'agapo) and was chosen by Piaf herself.

External links
 
 A biography by Theo's younger sister, Christie Laume

1936 births
1970 deaths
Road incident deaths in France
Modern Greek-language singers
Burials at Père Lachaise Cemetery
French people of Greek descent
20th-century French male singers